Marvel Now! (stylized as Marvel NOW!) is a comic book branding for the relaunch of several ongoing comic books published by Marvel Comics, that debuted in October 2012 with new #1 issues. The relaunch also included some new titles, including Uncanny Avengers and All-New X-Men. Described as a shifting of the Marvel Universe following the conclusion of the "Avengers vs. X-Men" storyline, Marvel Now! entailed changes to both the publishing format and the universe to attract new readers. Publishing changes included new creative teams for each of the titles and the in-universe changes included changes to character designs and new storylines. It marked the next stage of the Marvel ReEvolution initiative, which began in March 2012. The original run went through several waves before coming to an end in May 2015 at the start of the "Secret Wars" storyline. A second Marvel Now!, Marvel Now! 2.0, debuted in 2016 following the "Civil War II" storyline. Marvel Now! 2.0 was followed in 2017 by Marvel Legacy.

Publication history
Marvel Comics first announced the launch of Marvel Now! in July 2012. Marvel Editor-in-Chief Axel Alonso described it as "the next chapter in the ongoing saga of the Marvel Universe." Alonso further explained, "From October through February, we’ll provide at least one great reason for readers—old, lapsed or new—to go into a comic store each week: a new issue #1, featuring an exciting new creative team and driving concept, that’s an easy entry-point into the Marvel Universe." Marvel Chief Creative Officer Joe Quesada stressed that unlike DC Comics' The New 52, it is not a reboot, but a shifting of the Marvel Universe following the events of Avengers vs. X-Men. Quesada explained that there will be "a lot of changes to the character status quos, alter egos, costumes, creator shifts, design shifts, the way that we do our covers, digital shifts and the way we start delivering our books".

In March 2013, Alonso announced that Marvel would be launching a new wave of Marvel Now! titles, dubbed Wave Two, in the summer of that year. Alonso stated, "There are plans for a Marvel Now! Wave 2—a new wave of titles that will generate the same amount of excitement amongst retailers and fans that the first wave did. From 'Uncanny Avengers' to 'Thanos Rising,' Marvel Now! has been a hit, and we're far from done. Look for exciting new series, starting in July and carrying through next year". It was announced a week later that Avengers A.I. would be the first of these new titles.

In September 2013, Marvel announced a next phase of Marvel Now! in the aftermath of the "Infinity" storyline, (which led into the "Inhumanity" storyline) called "All-New Marvel Now!" which will see new series being launched and will also provide entry issue to existing series. These entry issues will be branded as .NOW issues. For example, Avengers #24 was billed as Avengers #24.NOW. Several new series, such as Inhuman and All-New Invaders were also announced.

In January 2014, Marvel announced that following the conclusion of the Ultimate Marvel miniseries Cataclysm in April 2014, and coinciding with the Marvel Universe All-New Marvel Now! launch, three new Ultimate series will debut from April 2014, under the banner Ultimate Marvel Now!. The three series are: Miles Morales: Ultimate Spider-Man, Ultimate FF, and All-New Ultimates.

In July 2014, Marvel announced that a fourth wave, Avengers Now!, would launch in October. The wave focuses exclusively on solo titles for individual Avengers, and takes place in the aftermath of the Original Sin event.

Marvel Now! officially ended in May 2015 at the start of the Secret Wars storyline, which saw the end of the Marvel Universe. Following the conclusion of Secret Wars, the universe is scheduled to be relaunched again in All-New All-Different Marvel. Alonso stated that the relaunches are reminiscent of the North American television season, explaining "I think that the comics industry – certainly, we are – slowly working into a season model that's not too unlike what we see in our favorite cable TV shows: a seasonal model that offers accessible entry points for new readers and is respectful of long-term fans. We did Marvel Now! and All-New Marvel Now!, which were both two very successful campaigns. And [All-New All-Different Marvel] is the latest campaign."

In May 2016, Marvel announced the return of Marvel Now! following the conclusion of the "Civil War II" storyline. Marvel Executive Editor Tom Brevoort stated that the relaunch is timed to coincide with "Civil War II" as means to "refresh and revitalize" the titles explaining, "One of the things a big event story is judged on, rightly or wrongly, is what kind of an impact it has on the Marvel Universe in its aftermath. That just becomes a condition of these big event stories: what is it at the end that changes the landscape?"

Titles

In other media
 On December 13, 2012, a special "Marvel Now!" category was featured on the television quiz show, Jeopardy!
 A costume based on the Marvel Now! title Indestructible Hulk was made available in the game Marvel Super Hero Squad Online in November 2012.

See also
 All-New, All-Different Marvel
 Marvel Legacy

References

External links
 Marvel Now! – Marvel Comics

2012 comics debuts
Comic book reboots